The Songs of Tony Sly: A Tribute is an album in tribute to No Use for a Name frontman Tony Sly who died in July 2012. It was put together by Sly's friend Fat Mike who put the album out on his label, Fat Wreck Chords, with all profits from the album benefiting the Tony Sly Memorial Fund. The album is made up of artists doing their own takes on No Use for a Name and Tony Sly songs.

Track listing

References

2013 compilation albums
Fat Wreck Chords compilation albums
Tribute albums